56 Squadron or 56th Squadron may refer to:

 No. 56 Squadron RAF, a unit of the United Kingdom Royal Air Force 
 56th Strategic Reconnaissance Squadron, a unit of the United States Air Force 
 56th Rescue Squadron, a unit of the United States Air Force 
 56th Airlift Squadron, a unit of the United States Air Force

See also
 56th Division (disambiguation)
 56th Group (disambiguation)
 56th Brigade (disambiguation)
 56th Regiment (disambiguation)